Brotherhood of Blades is a 2014 Chinese wuxia film directed by Lu Yang. Its sequel, Brotherhood of Blades II: The Infernal Battlefield was released on August 11, 2017. Set in the Ming dynasty (1368-1644), the story follows Shen Lian, a guard of the imperial secret police seeking and his three comrades as they are ordered to hunt down the former eunuch Wei Zhongxian and his faction within the imperial court. Starring Chang Chen, Cecilia Liu and Wang Qianyuan, the film was released in China on August 7, 2014.

Plot
The film is set in 1627, towards the end of the Ming dynasty, when the Chongzhen emperor decides to end the influence of all-powerful eunuch Wei Zhongxian or simply "Wei" (Chin Shih-Chieh) and purge his faction within the imperial court. Caught in the midst of the intrigue are three lowly cash-strapped officers of the embroidered uniform guard (锦衣卫; pinyin: Jǐnyīwèi), the imperial secret police of the court at the time, who are tasked with killing Wei.

In 1620 AD, Wei Zhongxian is the head Eunuch to the ailing emperor and controls the embroidered uniform guard, the secret police of the Ming Dynasty. After the death of the late emperor, his younger son, emperor Chongzhen assumes power and orders the purging of Wei's faction within the court in order to eliminate his malign influence. Shen Lian, a lowly captain of the guard along with his two comrades Lu Jian Xing and Jin Yi Chuan are asked by Zhao Jingzhong to take kill or capture Wei. Wei, who has been banished from the court and in exile still holds sway through agents planted within the court and secret police through his years as head Eunuch and still holds significant influence on the secret police, making killing him extremely difficult. The three eventually find Wei's hideout however Shen is tempted by Wei's large offers of gold in the hopes of securing himself a new life from his meagre wages as a guard in the emperor's service. Shen takes the gold and obscures the fact Wei is alive from his two friends Lu and Chuan. Shen's attempts to use his newly acquired gold to convince the commander of his bureau to transfer him to the imperial capital of Nanjing, however, Shen's superiors eventually find out, resulting in Lu being executed. Zhao Jingzhong, the head of the imperial secret police at the time is in league with Wei and attempts to kill Shen to cover up his treason along with Miao Tong a prostitute Shen has fallen in love with and attempts to free from the courtesan academy. Zhao pays Yi Chuan's brother, Yan, to kill Yi Chuan to silence him and conceal knowledge of his treason, but Yi Chuan sacrifices his life to save Yan from assassins. Zhao and Shen fight in a brothel however Shen narrowly escapes with Miao and Zhao is left unconscious. Zhao goes ahead and burns Wei alive. The film ends with Zhao and Shen fighting to the death as Zhao attempts to join hands with the Manchu on the edge of the Ming empire. Shen kills Zhao while Yi helps and is scheduled for death row however receives a pardon from the newly crowned Chongzhen emperor.

Cast
Chang Chen as Shen Lian
Cecilia Liu as Zhou Miao Tong
Wang Qianyuan as Lu Jian Xing
Ethan Li as Jin Yi Chuan
Nie Yuan as Zhao Jingzhong
Chin Shih-chieh as Wei Zhongxian
Ye Qing as Zhang Yan
Zhou Yiwei as Zhou Yi Wei
Zhu Dan as Wei Ting
Zhao Lixin as Han Kuang
Ye Xiang Ming as Emperor Chongzhen

Production
The story of Brotherhood of Blades was written by directors Lu Yang and Chen Shu. The script was already completed by the time Yu's debut feature My Spectacular Theatre was released in 2010. The film received funding only after Chang Chen had committed to the role of Shen Lian. The film received RMB30 million (US$5 million) from China Film and was shot in 67 days.

Release
Brotherhood of Blades was released on August 7, 2014, in China. Derek Elley of Film Business Asia wrote that the film was shown "with relatively little fanfare and a poor marketing campaign that harmed its box office in a strong field". At the end of its run, the film has earned ¥90 million ($14 million) in China.

The film was shown at the Busan International Film Festival in October 2014.

Reception
Derek Elley of Film Business Asia gave the film an eight out of ten ratings, calling it a "Top-notch martial-arts drama boasts a meaty script and performances to match" and "the most satisfying Chinese wuxia movie since Reign of Assassins"

Film and arts writer Philippa Hawker of Sydney Morning Herald gave the film 4.5 out of 5, praising the movie as "a gripping, entertaining martial arts drama in which the cut-and-thrust of the narrative is as important as the swordplay action. It's a film of plot twists and turns and moral ambiguities punctuated with combat scenes, an ensemble piece with strong performances and an involving storyline."

Awards and nominations

References

External links
 

2010s historical action films
Chinese martial arts films
Wuxia films
Films set in 17th-century Ming dynasty
Chinese historical action films
Films set in 1620
Films set in 1627
2014 martial arts films
Films about revenge
Films scored by Nathan Wang